Bread and Chocolate is a 1974 Italian comedy-drama film directed by Franco Brusati. This film chronicles the misadventures of an Italian immigrant to Switzerland and is representative of the commedia all'italiana film genre.

Plot
Like many southern Europeans of the period (1960s to early 1970s), Nino Garofalo (Nino Manfredi) is a migrant "guest worker" from Italy, working as a waiter in Switzerland. He loses his work permit when he is caught urinating in public, so he begins to lead a clandestine life in Switzerland.

At first he is supported by Elena, a Greek woman and political refugee. Then he is befriended by an Italian industrialist, relocated to Switzerland because of financial problems. The industrialist takes him under his wing and invests his savings for him, but kills himself after his financial scheme collapses, without having told Nino where he deposited his savings.

Nino is constrained to find shelter with a group of clandestine Neapolitans living in a chicken coop, together with the same chickens they tend to in order to survive.

Charmed by the idyllic vision of a group of young blonde Swisses, having a bath in a river, he decides to dye his hair and pass himself off as a local. In a bar, when openly rooting for the Italy national football team during the broadcast of a match, he is found out as a migrant Italian worker, after celebrating a goal scored by Fabio Capello.

He is arrested and brought to a police station. He meets Elena again, who wants to give him a renewed permit but he refuses. He embarks on a train and finds himself in a cabin filled with returning Italian guest workers. Amid the songs of "sun" and "sea", he is seen having second thoughts.

Cast
 Nino Manfredi as Nino Garofalo
 Johnny Dorelli as Italian Industrialist
 Anna Karina as Elena
 Paolo Turco as Gianni
 Ugo D'Alessio as Old Man
 Tano Cimarosa as Giacomo
 Gianfranco Barra as The Turk
 Giorgio Cerioni as Police Inspector
 Francesco D'Adda as Rudiger
 Geoffrey Copleston as Boegli
 Federico Scrobogna as Grigory
 Max Delys as Renzo
 Umberto Raho as Maitre
 Nelide Giammarco as The Blonde
 Manfred Freyberger as The Sportman

Reception

In the Chicago Sun-Times, film critic Roger Ebert wrote:Bread and Chocolate is a sneaky comedy that winds up being serious about its subject. It reminds us of some of Chaplin's later features, and maybe it's no coincidence that the lead character looks like Chaplin. He's a Southern Italian waiter named Nino (Nino Manfredi), who goes to Switzerland to tryout for a restaurant job and finds himself caught in a net of discrimination...

The only sympathy he gets comes from a neighbor (Anna Karina), a Greek immigrant who's concealing her child from the immigration authorities. Despondent, he goes into the country to find work on a chicken farm, and the film finds its best and most unforgettable image: a chicken-coop filled with immigrant laborers, who peer with admiration and envy through chicken wire at a crowd of Swiss kids frolicking in a pool.

It's here that we most completely feel the movie's underlying tension and seriousness. Other films have considered the dilemma of immigrant workers in Europe ... but not until this film by Franco Brusati has the subject been approached as a comedy.

Awards
 The film won several international awards including the Silver Bear at the 24th Berlin International Film Festival in 1974.
 New York Film Critics Circle Award for Best Foreign Language Film 1978

References

External links
 
 

1974 films
1974 comedy-drama films
Commedia all'italiana
1970s English-language films
Films directed by Franco Brusati
1970s German-language films
1970s Italian-language films
Films set in Switzerland
Films about immigration
Italian comedy-drama films
1974 multilingual films
Italian multilingual films
1970s Italian films